Biology Letters is a peer-reviewed, biological, scientific journal published by the Royal Society. It focuses on the rapid publication of short high quality research articles, reviews and opinion pieces across the biological sciences. Biology Letters has an average turnaround time of twenty four days from submission to a first decision.

The editor-in-chief is Professor David Beerling FRS (University of Sheffield) who is supported by an international Editorial Board of practising scientists.

Contents and themes

As well as the conventional, short research articles, Biology Letters has recently published Special Features and Mini Series. While Special Features are a collection of up to 20 articles on a specific theme and published across multiple issues, Mini Series include up to six articles that are published in one issue. Examples of topics in these formats include ocean acidification, fossils, extinction, enhanced rock weathering and the evolutionary ecology of species ranges.

Content in the journal is regularly covered in the mainstream and social media. At the time of writing, a paper on Goffin’s cockatoos making tools to reach food
 was featured in, The Guardian, New Scientist and The New York Times. Research describing the missing-link among dinosaurs
 was reported by BBC News, CNN and The Times.

A 2010 study of bumblebee behaviour by pupils from Blackawton Primary School is the journal's most downloaded paper.

History 
The journal was split off as a separate journal from the Proceedings of the Royal Society B: Biological Sciences in 2005 after having been published as a supplement. Originally it was published quarterly, then bimonthly, and since 2013 it has been published monthly. The journal publishes short articles from across biology online (printing each issue ceased at the start of 2020).

Indexing 
As of 2022 (2021 JCR index), Biology Letters has an impact factor of 3.812 and is ranked 30th in the Biology category. The journal is indexed in Google Scholar, PubMed, Scopus and Web of Science.

External links 
 
 Royal Society Publishing 
 The Royal Society

References 

Biology journals
Publications established in 2005
Bimonthly journals
English-language journals
Royal Society academic journals
2005 establishments in the United Kingdom